Louis François Binot (7 April 1771 – 8 February 1807) was a French Brigade General and Governor General of Pondicherry in 1802. 

Binot was "Colonel / Chief of Brigade" in 121st Regiment of infantry of line which is made under the French Revolution. On 22 November 1806, he was made as "General of Brigade". He was given the order of Legion of Honour on 25 December 1805. He was killed at the Battle of Eylau.

Honours 

 Name inscribed on the Arc de Triomphe

Titles
Chief of Brigade on 19 August 1801.
General of Brigade on 22 November 1806.
Légion d'honneur on 25 December 1805.

References

1771 births
1807 deaths
French soldiers
French colonial governors and administrators
Governors of French India
French military personnel killed in the Napoleonic Wars
French commanders of the Napoleonic Wars
Names inscribed under the Arc de Triomphe